Storm Catchers by Tim Bowler is a book is filled with mystery, drama, and adventure, based on a kidnap in the middle of a storm. It was first published in 2001.

Fin is devastated when his sister is kidnapped. Poor Ella, snatched away from their isolated family home in the middle of a raging storm. Fin will never forgive himself for leaving her on her own. Still, at least they'll get her back when they've paid the money.

But the kidnapper has more than just money on his mind. And as his plans unfold, Fin and his family are forced to confront their deepest, darkest secrets.

Characters 

These are the main characters that appear in the book:
 Ella Parnell: she was kidnapped in the middle of a storm.
 Fin Parnell: Ella's older brother. 
 Sam Parnell: Ella and Fin's little brother, who hallucinates about things.
 Peter Parnell: Sam, Ella and Fin's dad.
 Susan Parnell: Sam, Ella and Fin's mother.
 Billy Meade: Fin's best friend.
 Angela Meade: Ella's best friend.
 Mr Meade: Peter's friend, and Billy and Angela's dad.
 Mrs Meade: Susan's friend, and Billy and Angela's mum.
 Ricky Prescott: the kidnapper, Imogen's older brother
 Imogen Prescott: Peter Parnell's and Lindy Prescott's  daughter, the one Sam hallucinates about
 Lindy Prescott: who Fin's dad fornicated with;mum of Ricky and Imogen
 Edward Soriano: Adopted son of Peter and Susan Parnell

External links
Author's website

2001 British novels
British young adult novels
Novels by Tim Bowler
Novels about kidnapping
Works set in lighthouses
Oxford University Press books